Stephanie Neuman (October 30, 1931 - April 15, 2020) was an American political scientist specializing in international relations, comparative foreign policy, the international arms trade and Third World security.

She was born on October 30, 1931 in New York City and died on April 15, 2020 in New York City. She taught at Columbia University in New York City.

Life and work 
Stephanie Neuman was the daughter of Charles Glicksberg, a professor of English literature at Brooklyn College and of Dorothy Glicksberg, a teacher. She attended the Walden School, then studied at the Connecticut College for Women where she received a BA and at New York University where she earned an MA and a PhD in political science.
She taught International Relations at Douglass College at Rutgers University, at The New School For Social Research  and Hunter College, then from 1980 to 2020 at Columbia University where she established the Defense Studies Institute within the School of International and Public Affairs SIPA. She was married to Herbert Neuman for sixty-six years and was the mother of journalist and film producer Elena Neuman Lefkowitz.

Main publications
Small states and segmented societies: National political integration in a global environment, Praeger special studies in international politics and government, 1976.
 as editor: Arms transfers in the modern world, with Robert E. Harkavy (editor), Praeger, 1979. 
Defense planning in less-industrialized states: The Middle East and South Asia, Lexington Books, 1984. 
 with Robert E. Harkavy: The Lessons of Recent Wars in the Third World, two volumes, Lexington Books, 1985, 1987. 
Military Assistance in Recent Wars: The Dominance of the Superpowers (The Washington Papers), Praeger Security International, 1987. 
 as editor: International Relations Theory and the Third World, Palgrave. 
 with Robert E. Harkavy: Warfare and the Third World, Palgrave MacMillan, 2001.
 with Robert E. Harvaky: The Lessons of Recent Wars in the Third World, two volumes, Lexington Books, 1985, 1987. ; 
 "International Stratification and Third World Military Industries," in International Organization, (Winter 1984), pp. 167–97.
 “Arms, Aid and the Superpowers,” in: Foreign Affairs, Summer 1988 
 « Le contrôle des transferts d’armes : utopie ou réalité ? » Cultures et Conflits, No. 4, Réseaux Internationaux de violence vente d’armes et terrorisme (Hiver 1991-1992), pp. 93–111.
 "Power, Influence and Hierarchy: Defence Industries in a unipolar World" in: Defence and Peace Economics, 19 April 2010, pp. 105–134. 
 C-SPAN, with Rabbi Arnold Resnicoff: Religious faith and military service, January 24, 2006 Video:

References

1931 births
2020 deaths
American women political scientists
American political scientists
People from New York City
Connecticut College alumni
New York University alumni
Columbia University faculty
American women academics
21st-century American women